Kotli Sheikhan is a village in Jalandhar district of Punjab State, India. The village is administrated by a sarpanch who is an elected representative of village as per Panchayati raj (India).
Mastar Joginder Singh s/o Khushiya Singh Lambardaar of Kotli Sheikhan. 
List of villages in India

References

External links
List of villages in Jalandhar district at Census of India, 2011

Villages in Jalandhar district